The Osborn Maitland Miller Cartographic Medal was established in 1968 by the American Geographical Society Council. The Osborn Maitland Miller Cartographic Medal honors "outstanding contributions in the field of cartography or geodesy".

History
Osborn Maitland Miller's forty-six year career with the American Geographical Society was only one of the many accomplishments of his career. While on staff, Miller headed, researched, and taught at the American Geographical Society’s School of Surveying, specializing in photogrammetry and cartography. He developed the Miller cylindrical projection in 1942, and completed many other aerial photography and surveying projects. Miller was born in Perth, Scotland in 1897, and was educated at Glenalmond College and the Royal Military Academy, Woolwich, after which he served as a regular officer in the Royal Field Artillery in the First World War, being awarded the Military Cross in 1917  when he was severely injured. He became a US citizen in 1957 and died in 1979, in New York.

Recipients
The following people received the award in the year specified:

 1968: Richard Edes Harrison
 1989: Waldo R. Tobler
 1997: Maidarjavyn Ganzorig
 1998: Chen Shupeng
 1998: Arthur H. Robinson
 2001: Mark Monmonier
 2017: John Hanke and Brian McClendon
 2019: Cynthia Brewer

See also

 List of geography awards

References

External links
 Official website

Awards of the American Geographical Society
Awards established in 1968
1968 establishments in the United States